Piece of My Heart is a 2009 New Zealand television film starring Keisha Castle-Hughes, Annie Whittle, Emily Barclay, and Rena Owen. It is based on true events about unwed teen mothers in 1960's New Zealand, and what really happened in their harrowing journeys from pregnancy to the birth and adoption of their babies.

External links

2009 television films
2009 films
New Zealand television films
2009 drama films
New Zealand drama films